The Queen of the Stock Exchange (German:Die Börsenkönigin) is a 1918 German silent film directed by Edmund Edel and starring Asta Nielsen.

Cast
 Asta Nielsen as Helene Netzler  
 Aruth Wartan as Lindholm, Bergwerksdirektor  
 Willy Kaiser-Heyl as Chief Inspector Muller

References

Bibliography
 Jennifer M. Kapczynski & Michael D. Richardson. A New History of German Cinema.

External links

1918 films
Films of the German Empire
German silent feature films
German black-and-white films
1910s German films